The 1992 Baltimore Orioles season  was a season in American baseball. It involved the Orioles finishing third in the American League East with a record of 89 wins and 73 losses.

Having played almost 40 years at Memorial Stadium, the 1992 campaign was the inaugural season for the Orioles' new ballpark, Oriole Park at Camden Yards, where they play to this day.

Offseason
 November 13, 1991: Jeff Robinson was released by the Orioles.
 January 7, 1992: Amalio Carreño was signed as a free agent with the Baltimore Orioles.

Regular season
The Orioles spent most of the first three months of the season battling with the Toronto Blue Jays for first place in the division. The lead switched back and forth between the two teams before the Jays took it for good on June 20. Baltimore remained in second place for the next two months, with the margin between themselves and Toronto fluctuating from between one and five games. However, the Birds faded during the September stretch and relinquished second place to the Milwaukee Brewers on September 19. Still, they were not mathematically eliminated from contention until September 27, finishing at a respectable 89–73.

In 1992, Mike Mussina played his first full season with the Orioles. He finished with an 18–5 record and a 2.54 ERA in 241 innings; his .783 win–loss percentage was the best in the American League, and his 1.79 BB/9 was second-best in the AL behind the Brewers' Chris Bosio. Mussina also pitched four shutouts, tying for second in the league behind Boston's Roger Clemens. He finished fourth in the American League Cy Young Award voting, and participated in the 1992 Major League Baseball All-Star Game in San Diego, pitching one perfect inning.

Oriole Park at Camden Yards
In 1992, with grand ceremony, the Orioles began their season in a brand new ballpark, Oriole Park at Camden Yards, and thus retiring Memorial Stadium in the major league baseball world. The ballpark was an instant success; however, the name of the new park had controversy. Many felt that since the Orioles' new home was so close to Babe Ruth's birthplace that the new park should have been named after Ruth instead of being indirectly named after the Earl of Camden, Charles Pratt, who was a Briton who never set foot on American soil. There was also the superficial connection to the fact that Ruth played for the Orioles early in his career, but the Orioles team that Ruth played for was in no way related to the Orioles team that moved to Baltimore from St. Louis. Camden Yards was built at the location of the old Camden Railway. It was the first of the "retro" major league ballparks constructed during the 1990s and early 2000s, and remains one of the most highly praised.

Season standings

Record vs. opponents

Notable transactions
 August 11, 1992: Juan Bell was traded by the Orioles to the Philadelphia Phillies for Steve Scarsone.

Roster

Player stats

Batting

Starters by position
Note: Pos = Position; G = Games played; AB = At bats; H = Hits; Avg. = Batting average; HR = Home runs; RBI = Runs batted in

Other batters
Note: G = Games played; AB = At bats; H = Hits; Avg. + Batting average; HR = Home runs; RBI = Runs batted in

Pitching

Starting pitchers 
Note: G = Games pitched; IP = Innings pitched; W = Wins; L = Losses; ERA = Earned run average; SO = Strikeouts

Relief pitchers 
Note: G = Games pitched; W = Wins; L = Losses; SV = Saves; ERA = Earned run average; SO = Strikeouts

Awards and honors
 Cal Ripken Jr., shortstop, Roberto Clemente Award

Farm system

LEAGUE CHAMPIONS: Bluefield

References

1992 Baltimore Orioles team page at Baseball Reference
1992 Baltimore Orioles season at baseball-almanac.com

Baltimore Orioles seasons
Baltimore Orioles season
Baltimore